Azizul Islam (2 May 1944) is a Bangladeshi flutist. He was awarded Ekushey Padak by the Government of Bangladesh in the music category in 2017.

Early life
Islam studied in Government Muslim High School Chittagong and Chittagong College. He then graduated from Bangladesh Marine Academy. He became a captain of a merchant vessel. He was trained under Ranjan Sengupta and Vilayat Ali Khan.

Career
Islam left the marine job in 1973. He became a student of the Indian sarod player Ustad Bahadur Khan to acquire the knowledge of the performing style of Seni Gharana. Then he received lessons from the flutists Devendra Murdeshwar and VG Karnad, both disciples of Pannalal Ghosh.

Awards
 Sangeet Piyasi Award
 Paul Harris Fellow Award
 Sahitya Academy Award
 Ekushey Padak (2017)

References

Living people
1944 births
Bangladeshi flautists
Recipients of the Ekushey Padak
People from Rajbari District
Chittagong College alumni